Nicholas Chare is a professor of art history at the Université de Montréal. He received his Bachelor of Arts in English and the history of art from the University of Leeds in 1997, and his Master of Arts in the social history of art from the same institution in 1998. He received his PhD from the University of Leeds in 2005. He has served as an instructor at the University of Melbourne, the University of Leeds, the University of Reading, the University of York, and Goldsmiths, University of London.

He is the author of Auschwitz and Afterimages: Abjection, Witnessing and Representation, After Francis Bacon: Synaesthesia and Sex in Paint and co-editor of Representing Auschwitz: At the Margins of Testimony (2013) and Matters of Testimony : Interpreting the Scrolls of Auschwitz (2017).

Chare was a 2007 recipient of the Leverhulme Trust Award recognising his research into paintings by Francis Bacon.

Works

Books

 Chare, Nicolas; Franck, Mitchell B. (edited by). (2021) History and Art History: Looking Past Disciplines. New York: Routledge. OCLC 1237709112.

References

External links
Nicholas Chare, profile at the University of Melbourne
Nicholas Chare, bio at the University of York
Dr Nicholas Chare, description page at University of Reading
Nicholas Chare, author page at Macmillan

Gender studies academics
Living people
Academic staff of the University of Melbourne
Alumni of the University of Leeds
Academics of the University of York
Academics of the University of Reading
Academics of the University of Leeds
Academics of Goldsmiths, University of London
Year of birth missing (living people)